Andropolia contacta, the Canadian giant, is a moth in the family Noctuidae. The species was first described by Francis Walker in 1856. 

The larvae feed on Alnus, Betula, Salix and Populus tremuloides.

Subspecies
Andropolia contacta contacta
Andropolia contacta pulverulenta (Colorado, ...)

References

External links

Acronictinae
Moths of North America
Moths described in 1856